Manuel Guijarro Doménech (born 7 January 1963) is a Spanish former racing cyclist. He rode in the 1989 Tour de France and the 1989 Vuelta a España.

References

External links

1963 births
Living people
Spanish male cyclists
People from Alacantí
Sportspeople from the Province of Alicante
Cyclists from the Valencian Community